Izagaondoa is a town and municipality located in the province and autonomous community of Navarre, in northern Spain.

References

External links
 IZAGAONDOA in the Bernardo Estornés Lasa - Auñamendi Encyclopedia, Euskomedia Fundazioa 

Municipalities in Navarre